Sandeep Singh (born 1986) is an Indian field hockey player.

Sandeep Singh may also refer to:
Sandeep Singh (air marshal), Air Marshal of the Indian Air Force
Sandeep Singh (cricketer, born 1981), Indian first-class cricketer
Sandeep Singh (cricketer, born 1988) (1988–2014), Indian first-class cricketer
Sandeep Singh (producer), Indian film producer
Sandeep Singh (politician) (born 1991), Indian politician
Sandeep Singh (footballer) (born 1995), Indian footballer
 Sandeep Singh, Indian worker and survivor of the 2010 Kallang Slashings in Singapore.